Front Line Assembly, a Canadian Vancouver-based electro-industrial band, has released seventeen studio albums, three live albums, numerous singles and compilations, and two video game soundtracks. With Bill Leeb being the founder and sole permanent member of the band, Michael Balch, Rhys Fulber and Chris Peterson were acting as long-time members during different periods of time.

Demos

Albums

Studio albums

Live albums

Compilation albums

Extended plays

Remix albums

Soundtracks

Tribute albums

From Front Line Assembly

To Front Line Assembly

Singles

Music videos

Compilation appearances

References
General

 
 
 
 

Specific

Electronic music discographies
Discographies of Canadian artists